Drinjača (Serbian Cyrillic: Дрињача) is a left tributary of the Drina in eastern Bosnia and Herzegovina. It rises on the mountain of Konjuh (1,326 m) 15 km northeast of Kladanj at an elevation of about 1,000 m and ends after 87.5 km in the Drina, south of Zvornik. The catchment area covers 1,091 km².

The river Drinjača offers terrains for recreational fishing on salmonids and numerous other fish species, but is primarily an important spawning ground for huchen and nase, both of which enter the river from the Drina river.

References

Rivers of Bosnia and Herzegovina
Zvornik
Glasinac plateau
Hucho habitats in Bosnia and Herzegovina
Recreational fishing in Bosnia and Herzegovina